Belle Prairie may refer to one of the following places in the United States:

 Belle Prairie City, Illinois
 Belle Prairie Township, Livingston County, Illinois
 Belle Prairie Township, Morrison County, Minnesota
 Belle Prairie Township, Fillmore County, Nebraska